Aleksandar Dimitrov Manolov (born 3 March 1990) is a Bulgarian footballer who plays as a midfielder for Drenovets.

Career
In june 2017, Manolov joined Montana.  He left the club at the end of the season when his contract expired.

On 6 July 2018, Manolov signed with Minyor Pernik.

References

External links
 
 

Bulgarian footballers
1990 births
Living people
Footballers from Sofia
First Professional Football League (Bulgaria) players
Second Professional Football League (Bulgaria) players
FC Lokomotiv 1929 Sofia players
PFC Marek Dupnitsa players
FC Septemvri Sofia players
FC Montana players
PFC Minyor Pernik players
Association football midfielders